The Jeff Bond House, on Kentucky Route 172 in Red Bush, Kentucky Redbush, Kentucky was built in the 1890s.  It was listed on the National Register of Historic Places in 1989.

It is a two-story five-bay house.  It was built by Jeff Bond, a Civil War veteran and a drummer (salesman) for Kitchen and Witt.

References

National Register of Historic Places in Johnson County, Kentucky
Houses completed in 1890
Houses in Johnson County, Kentucky
1890 establishments in Kentucky
Double pen architecture in the United States
Houses on the National Register of Historic Places in Kentucky